Armada Music is a Dutch independent record label that specialises in releasing electronic dance music. The name Armada derives from the first two letters of the founders' first names: Armin van Buuren, Maykel Piron and David Lewis.

Signed artists 
Artists currently signed by Armada Music include:

 Andrew Rayel
 Armin van Buuren
 Arty
 Audien
 Bob Sinclar
 Brando
 Cedric Gervais
 Chicane
 D.O.D
 Eelke Kleijn
 Ferry Corsten
 Goldfish
 Inner City
 Janieck
 Kevin Saunderson
 Kidnap
 Loud Luxury
 Mark Sixma
 MistaJam
 Morgan Page
 Orjan Nilsen
 R Plus
 Shapov
 Sunnery James & Ryan Marciano
 Super8 & Tab
 Tempo Giusto
 Tensnake
 Themba
 Tom Staar
 Youngr

Awards and nominations 

As of December 2015, the label had won the "Best Global Record Label" award for five years in a row at the International Dance Music Awards (IDMA's). Armada received two nominations at the 2014 IDMAs. The Academy of Electronic Music, a joint venture between Armada, Google, Point Blank, and DJ Mag, was the recipient of the 'People's Voice Award' at the 2014 Webby Awards. In 2016, Armada Music was one of the 21 labels nominated for the IMPALA FIVEUNDERFIFTEEN campaign shining a light on Europe's most inspiring young labels. The label received the IMPALA Young Label Spotlight Award.

References

External links 
 
 

Dutch record labels
Trance record labels
House music record labels
Electronic dance music record labels
IFPI members
Armin van Buuren
Record labels established in 2003
2003 establishments in the Netherlands
Companies based in Amsterdam